Karolina Kołeczek (born 15 January 1993 in Sandomierz) is a Polish athlete specialising in the 100 metres hurdles. She won silver medals at two consecutive European U23 Championships.

She has personal bests of 12.75 seconds in the 100 metres hurdles (+0.3 m/s, Chorzów 2019) and 8.03 seconds in the 60 metres hurdles (Toruń 2019).

Competition record

References

1993 births
Living people
Polish female hurdlers
Athletes (track and field) at the 2010 Summer Youth Olympics
People from Sandomierz
World Athletics Championships athletes for Poland
Athletes (track and field) at the 2016 Summer Olympics
Olympic athletes of Poland
Competitors at the 2017 Summer Universiade